Chak or CHAK may refer to:

Places

 Chak (village), synonym of term village established by the British Raj in British India under the irrigation area of newly built canals
 Chak village a village in India 
 Chak Bahmanian, a village in India 
 Chak Bilgan, a village in India 
 Chak Des Raj, a village in India 
 Chak Guru, a village in India 
 Chak, Iran (disambiguation), places in Iran
 Chak Jhumra, a village in Pakistan
Chak Beli Khan, town in Pakistan
 Chak Mai Dass, a village in India
 Chak, Punjab, a village in Pakistan  
 Chak, Sindh, a town in Shikarpur District, Sindh, Pakistan
 Chaki Wardak District, in Wardak Province, Afghanistan

Entertainment and media
 CHAK (AM), a radio station (860 AM) licensed to Inuvik, Northwest Territories, Canada
 CHAK-TV, a television station (channel 6) licensed to Inuvik, Northwest Territories, Canada

Other
 Chak dynasty of Kashmir.
 Chak people of Bangladesh
 Zhai (Chak in Cantonese), a Chinese surname

See also 
 Chacmool